The Komi Republic, sometimes simply referred to as Komi, is a republic of Russia located in Eastern Europe. Its capital is the city of Syktyvkar. The population of the republic as of the 2010 Census was 901,189.

History

The Komi people first feature in the records of the Novgorod Republic in the 12th century, when East Slavic traders from Novgorod traveled to the Perm region in search of furs and animal hides.
The Komi territories came under the influence of Muscovy in the late Middle Ages (late 15th to early 16th centuries). The site of Syktyvkar, settled from the 16th century, was known as Sysolskoye (Сысольскoe). In 1780, under Catherine the Great, it was renamed to Ust-Sysolsk (Усть-Сысольск) and used as a penal colony.

Russians explored the Komi territory most extensively in the 19th and early 20th centuries, starting with the expedition led by Alexander von Keyserling in 1843. They found ample reservoirs of various minerals, as well as timber, to exploit. After the founding of the Soviet Union in 1922, the Komi-Zyryan Autonomous Oblast was established on August 22, 1921, and on December 5, 1936, it was reorganized into the Komi Autonomous Soviet Socialist Republic with its administrative center located at the town of Syktyvkar.

Many of the "settlers" who arrived in the early 20th century were prisoners of the Gulag – sent by the hundreds of thousands to perform forced labor in the Arctic regions of the USSR. Towns sprang up around labor-camp sites, which gangs of prisoners initially carved out of the untouched tundra and taiga. The first mine, "Rudnik No. 1", became the city of Vorkuta, and other towns of the region have similar origins: "Prisoners planned and built all of the republic's major cities, not just Ukhta but also Syktyvkar, Pechora, Vorkuta, and Inta. Prisoners built Komi's railways and roads, as well as its original industrial infrastructure." On 21 March 1996, the Komi Republic signed a power-sharing agreement with the government of Russia, granting it autonomy. The agreement was abolished on 20 May 2002.

Geography

The republic is situated to the west of the Ural mountains, in the north-east of the East European Plain. The Polar Urals rise in the northeastern part. Forests cover over 70% of the territory, and swamps cover approximately 15%. The Komi Republic is the second-largest federal region by area in European Russia after Arkhangelsk Oblast.

Area: 
Borders (all internal): Nenets (NW/N), Yamalo-Nenets (NE/E), Khanty–Mansi (E), Sverdlovsk (SE), Perm Krai (S), Kirov (S/SW), and Arkhangelsk (W).
Highest point: Mount Narodnaya (1,894 m)
Maximum N→S distance: 
Maximum E→W distance:

Rivers
Major rivers include:
Izhma River
Mezen River
Pechora River
Sysola River
Usa River
Vashka River
Vychegda River
Vym River

Lakes
There are many lakes in the republic. Major lakes include:
Sindorskoye Lake
Yam-Ozero Lake

Natural resources

The republic's natural resources include coal, oil, natural gas, gold, diamonds, and timber.  Native reindeer are in abundance and have been intentionally bred for human usage by the indigenous population.

Around 32,800 km2 of mostly boreal forest (as well as some alpine tundra and meadows) in the Republic's Northern Ural Mountains have been recognized in 1995 as a UNESCO World Heritage Site, Virgin Komi Forests. It is the first natural UNESCO World Heritage Site in Russia and the largest expanse of virgin forests in Europe.  The site includes two pre-existing protected areas: Pechora-Ilych Nature Reserve (created in 1930) and Yugyd Va National Park (created in 1994).

Climate
Winters in the republic are long and cold, and the summers, while short, are quite warm.
Lowest recorded temperature:  (village of Ust-Shchuger)
Average annual precipitation:

Manpupuner and the 7 Strong Men rock formations

Deemed one of the Seven Wonders of Russia, the Komi Republic is home to Manpupuner (Man-Pupu-Nyer), a mysterious site in the northern Ural mountains, in the Troitsko-Pechorsky District, made out of seven rock towers bursting out of the flat plateau known as the "7 Strong Men". Manpupuner is a very popular attraction in Russia, but not on an international level. Information regarding its origin is scarce. However, it is known that their height and abnormal shapes make the top of these rock giants inaccessible even to experienced rock-climbers.

Administrative divisions

Demographics

Population

Population:

Settlements

Vital statistics
Source: Russian Federal State Statistics Service

Regional vital statistics for 2011
Source:

Ethnic groups
According to the 2010 Census, ethnic Russians make up 65.1% of the republic's population, while the ethnic Komi make up 23.7%. Other groups include Ukrainians (4.2%), Tatars (1.3%), Belarusians (1%), Ethnic Germans (0.6%), Chuvash (0.6%), Azeris (0.6%), and a host of smaller groups, each accounting for less than 0.5% of the total population.

Religion

According to a 2012 survey, 30.2% of the population of Komi adheres to the Russian Orthodox Church, 4% are unaffiliated generic Christians, 1% are Rodnovers or Komi native religious believers, 1% are Muslims, 1% are Orthodox Christians not belonging to churches or members of non-Russian Orthodox churches, 1% are Old Believers, and 0.4% are members of the Catholic Church. In addition, 41% of the population declared to be "spiritual but not religious", 14% is atheist, and 6.4% follows other religions or failed to answer the question.

Education
There are over 450 secondary schools in the republic (with ~180,000 students).  The most important higher education facilities include Komi Republican Academy of State Service and Administration, Syktyvkar State University and Ukhta State Technical University.

Politics
The head of government in the Komi Republic is the Head of the Republic. As of 2021, the current Head is Vladimir Uyba who took office after his predecessor Sergey Gaplikov resigned.

The State Council is the legislature.

Economy
The Komi Republic's major industries include oil processing, timber, woodworking, natural gas and electric power industries.  Major industrial centers are Syktyvkar, Inta, Pechora, Sosnogorsk, Ukhta, and Vorkuta.

Komigaz conducts natural gas transportation and distribution.

Transportation
Railroad transportation is very well developed.  The most important railroad line is Kotlas–Vorkuta–Salekhard, which is used to ship most goods in and out of the republic.  The rivers Vychegda and Pechora are navigable.  There are airports in Syktyvkar, Ukhta, and Vorkuta.

In 1997, total railroad trackage was 1,708 km, automobile roads 4,677 km.

Sports
Stroitel plays again in the Russian Bandy Super League in the 2017–18 season, after several years in Russian Bandy Supreme League, the second highest division. In 2015 a bandy federation for the republic was founded. In 2016 the authorities presented a five-year plan to develop bandy in the republic. There is an application in place to host the 2021 Bandy World Championship.

See also
Komi-Permyak Okrug
Komi mythology
Udoria
Extreme points of Europe
Valery Leontiev
List of rural localities in the Komi Republic

References

Notes

l

Sources

"Коми АССР. Административно-территориальное деление на 1 июля 1968 г." Коми книжное издательство. Сыктывкар, 1968. (Komi ASSR. Administrative-Territorial Structure as of July 1, 1968)

Further reading
Pearson, M., Ojanen, P., Havimo, M., Kuuluvainen, T. & Vasander, H. (eds.) 2007. On the European Edge: Journey through Komi Nature and Culture. University of Helsinki Department of Forest Ecology Publications 36. 216 pp. .
Strogoff, M., Brochet, P. & Auzias, D. 2005. Guidebook Komi Republic. Avant-Garde Publishers, Moscow. 176 pp. .

External links

 Official site of the Republic of Komi
 All news of the Republic of Komi
 Website of Syktyvkar City - The Capital of the Republic of Komi
 Official website of the Vorkuta City
Official site of the Syktyvkar State University)
 Official site of the Syktyvkar State University)
 Official site of the Ukhta State Technical University
 Snowboarding in Komi Republic
 History Komi
Historic-demographic note on the Nenets of the Komi Republic
Virgin Komi Forests at Natural Heritage Protection Fund

 
States and territories established in 1936
Members of the Unrepresented Nations and Peoples Organization
Russian-speaking countries and territories
Regions of Europe with multiple official languages